The 1996–97 Kategoria e Dytë was the 50th season of a second-tier association football league in Albania.

The season was interrupted before the start of spring part of the season, due to the economic-political crisis in Albania in 1997.

Group A

Group B

References

 Giovanni Armillotta

Kategoria e Parë seasons
2
Alba